The 1968 Davidson Wildcats football team represented Davidson College as a member of the Southern Conference (SoCon) during the 1968 NCAA University Division football season. Led by fourth-year head coach Homer Smith, the Wildcats compiled an overall record of 3–6 with a mark of 1–3 in conference play, tying for fifth place in the SoCon.

Schedule

References

Davidson
Davidson Wildcats football seasons
Davidson Wildcats football